The 165th (Liverpool) Brigade was an infantry brigade of the British Army that served during the First World War, with the 55th (West Lancashire) Division. During the Second World War, as part of the 55th (West Lancashire) Infantry Division, the brigade remained in the United Kingdom.

Formation
The brigade was raised in 1908 when the Territorial Force was created, by the amalgamation of the Yeomanry and the Volunteer Force, and was originally formed as the Liverpool Brigade attached to the West Lancashire Division. The brigade was composed of the 5th, 6th, 7th and 8th battalions of the King's Regiment (Liverpool).

First World War
The First World War began in August 1914 and most of the men of the brigade immediately volunteered for Imperial Service overseas although they were not obliged to do so, as the Territorial Force was initially intended to act as a home defence force during wartime. The Territorial Force was, therefore, split into a 1st Line and a 2nd Line. The 1st Line was liable for service overseas and the 2nd Line was intended to perform a home defence role and to send drafts of replacements to the 1st Line units serving overseas. The West Lancashire Division and Liverpool Brigade formed a duplicate 2nd Line units, the 2nd West Lancashire Division and 2nd Liverpool Brigade. To distinguish the 1st Line battalions from the 2nd Line, they adopted the fractional '1/', for all 1st Line units, (1/5th King's) and '2/' (2/5th King's) for all 2nd Line.

However, between November 1914 and March 1915, all the infantry battalions of the West Lancashire Division were sent overseas to France and Belgium to reinforce the British Expeditionary Force on the Western Front which had suffered heavy casualties and was struggling to hold the line. As a result, the division was temporarily disbanded and the 1st Liverpool Brigade joined with its 2nd Line, now numbered as the 171st (2/1st Liverpool) Brigade, and the division 57th (2nd West Lancashire) Division.

In early 1916 the West Lancashire Division was reformed, and now numbered as the 55th (West Lancashire) Division and the brigades were also numbered, the 1st Liverpool Brigade becoming 165th (1st Liverpool) Brigade

The brigade served with the 55th Division for the rest of the war on the Western Front at the Third Battle of Ypres, Battle of Cambrai and the Battle of Estaires in 1918.

Order of Battle
1/5th Battalion, King's Regiment (Liverpool) (left 22 February 1915, rejoined January 1916)
 1/6th (Rifle) Battalion, King's Regiment (Liverpool) (left 25 February 1915, rejoined February 1916)
 1/7th Battalion, King's Regiment (Liverpool) (left 8 March 1915, rejoined January 1916)
 1/8th (Irish) Battalion, King's Regiment (Liverpool) (left February 1915)
 1/9th Battalion, King's Regiment (Liverpool) (from January 1916 to February 1918)
 165th Machine Gun Company, Machine Gun Corps (formed 26 February 1916, moved to 55th Battalion, Machine Gun Corps 7 March 1918)
 165th Trench Mortar Battery (formed March 1916)

Between the wars
The brigade was disbanded after the war in 1919 when the Territorial Force was disbanded. It was later renamed in 1920 as the Territorial Army. The brigade came into existence again as the 165th (Liverpool) Infantry Brigade, again assigned to the 55th (West Lancashire Division) and again had the same four battalions of the King's Regiment (Liverpool). However, under the Geddes Axe, the 8th (Irish) Battalion was disbanded on 31 March 1922 and were replaced in the brigade by the 10th (Scottish) Battalion, previously from the 166th (South Lancashire) Infantry Brigade.

The composition of the brigade remained unchanged throughout most of the inter-war years. In the late 1930s, however, many infantry battalions of the Territorial Army were converted to new roles, mainly anti-aircraft or searchlight units. The 6th (Rifle) Battalion was transferred to the Royal Engineers and converted to 38th (The King's) Anti-Aircraft Battalion, Royal Engineers, assigned to the 33rd (Western) Anti-Aircraft Group, 2nd Anti-Aircraft Division, serving alongside other units converted from infantry battalions. They replaced in the brigade by the 4th/5th Battalion, Cheshire Regiment. In 1938, the 10th (Scottish) Battalion was transferred to the Queen's Own Cameron Highlanders and was re-titled as the Liverpool Scottish but remained with the brigade. In the same year, when all infantry brigades of the British Army were reduced from four to three battalions, the 7th Battalion, King's was transferred to the Royal Tank Regiment and became 40th (The King's) Royal Tank Regiment, assigned to 23rd Army Tank Brigade. When the 7th Battalion left to become 40th RTR they were replaced by 4th Battalion, South Lancashire Regiment, previously from 166th (South Lancashire) Infantry Brigade. Sometime in 1939, the brigade was redesignated 165th Infantry Brigade.

Second World War
The brigade again served in the Second World War with the 55th Division throughout the war and, in October 1941, no longer was an operational formation to be sent overseas. In January 1942 it was reduced to a Lower Establishment yet it was not reduced to a training division as most others were. In December 1943, with the division, it was sent to Northern Ireland and was raised to a Higher Establishment in May 1944, before returning to the United Kingdom in July. It served there until the war finally ended in 1945 and the division was disbanded in 1946 and was not reformed.

Order of Battle
 5th Battalion, King's Regiment (Liverpool) (to 1 April 1943)
 1st Battalion, Liverpool Scottish, (Queen's Own Cameron Highlanders) (to 13 July 1944)
 2nd Battalion, Liverpool Scottish, (Queen's Own Cameron Highlanders) (to 13 September 1942)
 165th Infantry Brigade Anti-Tank Company (formed 14 September 1940, disbanded 26 December 1941)
 10th Battalion, Duke of Wellington's Regiment (from 13 September 1942 to 13 July 1944)
 9th Battalion, King's Regiment (Liverpool) (from 12 April 1943 to 12 July 1944)
 4th Battalion, Black Watch (Royal Highland Regiment) (from 26 July 1944)
 2nd Battalion, Royal Irish Fusiliers (from 26 July 1944)
 5th Battalion, West Yorkshire Regiment (from 26 July 1944)

Recipients of the Victoria Cross
 Private Arthur Herbert Procter, 1/5th Battalion, King's Regiment (Liverpool)

References

Infantry brigades of the British Army in World War I
Infantry brigades of the British Army in World War II
B165
Military units and formations in Liverpool
Military units and formations established in 1908
Military units and formations disestablished in 1919
Military units and formations established in 1920
Military units and formations disestablished in 1945